Edward George Barnard (born 20 November 1995) is an English cricketer who plays for Worcestershire County Cricket Club. A batting all-rounder, he bowls right-arm fast-medium, and bats right-handed. He made his first-class debut for Worcestershire against Hampshire in May 2015.

References

External links
 
 

1995 births
Living people
Sportspeople from Shrewsbury
People educated at Shrewsbury School
English cricketers
Worcestershire cricketers
Shropshire cricketers